Charaxes berkeleyi is a butterfly in the family Nymphalidae. It is found in Kenya and Tanzania.

Description
Similar, externally, to Charaxes aubyni but the genitalia are distinctive. Compared to Charaxes aubyni the male forewing  has bluer marginal spots are and the underside is darker; in the female the forewing has two rows of pale yellow to ochreous spots and a white, blue-bordered median band which is narrower than in Charaxes aubyni There are two female forms: a common form with brownish underside and yellowish spots on the upperside and  form ngonga which has a whitish median band on upperside and a silvery grey underside with strongly contrasted black markings.

Biology
The habitat consists of montane and riverine forests.

The larvae feed on Albizia gummifera, Scutia myrtina, Ochna holstii and Ochna insculpta.

Taxonomy
Charaxes berkeleyi is a member of the large species group Charaxes etheocles

Subspecies
Charaxes berkeleyi berkeleyi (central and southern Kenya, northern Tanzania)
Charaxes berkeleyi marci Congdon & Collins, 1998  (northern Tanzania)
Charaxes berkeleyi masaba van Someren, 1969<ref>Van Someren, V.G.L. 1969. Revisional notes on African Charaxes (Lepidoptera:
Nymphalidae). Part V. Bulletin of the British Museum (Natural History) (Entomology) 23: 75-166.</ref> (Kenya: west to the area ranging from Kaptagat to the eastern slopes of Mount Elgon)

References

Victor Gurney Logan Van Someren, 1966 Revisional notes on African Charaxes (Lepidoptera: Nymphalidae). Part III. Bulletin of the British Museum (Natural History) (Entomology)45-101.
Van Someren, 1969 Revisional notes on African Charaxes (Lepidoptera: Nymphalidae). Part V. Bulletin of the British Museum (Natural History) (Entomology)75-166. Additional notes

External links
African Charaxes/ Charaxes Africains Eric Vingerhoedt  berkeleyi species page and images 
Charaxes berkleyi images at Charaxes'' page Consortium for the Barcode of Life subspecies and forms
African Butterfly Database Range map via search

Butterflies described in 1957
berkeleyi